Kronichthys heylandi is a species of armored catfish endemic to Brazil where it occurs in coastal streams between Santos and Rio de Janeiro.  This species grows to a length of  TL.

The fish is named in honor of civil engineer Herbert K. Heyland (1849-1944), who collected the type specimen and presented the specimen to the British Museum to be described.

References 

 

Loricariidae
Catfish of South America
Endemic fauna of Brazil
Freshwater fish of Brazil
Environment of Rio de Janeiro (state)
Environment of São Paulo (state)
Taxa named by George Albert Boulenger
Fish described in 1900